Hadisa Qurbonova (born February 17, 1940), sometimes known by the mononym Hadisa, is a Tajikistani poet and playwright. She was named National Poet of Tajikistan in 2010.

Life and career
Qurbonova was born in Khavaling, Kulob District, and raised in an orphanage. In 1963, she graduated from Tajikistan State University, and in 1965 from the correspondence division of the Moscow Institute of Polygraphy. In the intervening years she worked at Irfon Publishers; in 1965 she took a job with the journal Pioniri Tojikiston, remaining there until 1967. She was an editor of the State Committee for Radio and Television from 1967 until 1974, in which year she became an editor for the State Committee on Polygraphy and Books. She joined the Communist Party of the Soviet Union in 1977, and the Union of Soviet Writers in 1978. Qurbonova's early poems began to appear in the 1960s. They take as their themes such subjects as love and patriotism. She has since written a number of plays as well, dealing with contemporary topics. She has remained an active part of Tajikistan's literary life since the country gained its independence in 1991, appearing at literary festivals and editing the work of younger writers. She has 3 daughters (Nodira, Nazira and Madina) and 7 grandchildren (Maruf - citizen of Ukraine, living in Ukraine, Komron - living in USA, Kamilla, Nokhid, Shohina, Siyovush, Mukhammad).

Awards and honours
 2010, National Poet of Tajikistan

Selected works
Source:

Poetry
Paimon (Pact, 1972)
Shukrona(Thanksgiving, 1980)Nuri Oktiobr (The Light of October, 1981)Dargohi Oftob (The Threshold of the Sun, 1986)Dunioi Javoni (The Youth World, 1967).

PlaysMunisa (Munisa, 1976)Duroha (Fork in the Road, 1978)Mash'ali Jovid'' (Eternal Flame, 1984)

References

1940 births
Living people
Tajikistani women poets
20th-century Tajikistani poets
Tajikistani dramatists and playwrights
Soviet women poets
Women dramatists and playwrights
21st-century Tajikistani poets
20th-century dramatists and playwrights
21st-century dramatists and playwrights
People from Khatlon Region
Communist Party of the Soviet Union members
20th-century Tajikistani writers
20th-century Tajikistani women writers
21st-century Tajikistani writers
21st-century Tajikistani women writers
Tajik National University alumni